"Blind Faith" is a song by British drum and bass duo Chase & Status. It was released as the second official single, and the third overall, from their second studio album, No More Idols (2011). The single features vocals from Liam Bailey, and was released on 21 January 2011. The single peaked at number five on the UK Singles Chart, tying with "Count On Me" as their highest-charting single to date. The chorus of the song also features vocals performed by Yolanda Quartey. and samples  from 'Let The Music Take Control ' by Joey Negro and the Sunshine Band.  "Blind Faith" is featured on the soundtrack of the racing video games Dirt 3 and Forza Horizon. The song was used by BBC Sport during its coverage of the 2013 World Athletics Championships.

Critical reception
Robert Copsey of Digital Spy gave the song a perfect 5/5 review, stating: "Long before Britney knocked us for six with that head-spinning dubstep breakdown on her comeback hit, Chase & Status had a few startling syncopated moments of their own, you know. In fact, we could happily spend the weekend drawing up a neat 'Six Degrees of Dubstep' table to show how, two years since the London duo's debut, the genre's gone from scuzzy underground raves to the sound of choice for pop's A-listers. Of course, there are no double entendres or Spears-style vocal trickery here – just a straight-up grime/dance crossover cut that's both thumpingly energetic and beautifully uplifiting. Guest crooner Liam Bailey's soulful vocals are both soaring and cinematic, while the Yolanda Quartey-helmed chorus sounds like a million '90s club classics rolled into one. Seventeen spins on, it's got us as excited as a Grandad-on-viagra for tonight's dancefloor debauchery.".

Music video
The music video for "Blind Faith" appeared on YouTube on 9 December 2010. The video is set during the illegal warehouse rave era of the early 1990s, and features a group of people partying in empty warehouses where Chase & Status are playing. Liam Bailey is shown in several scenes, and subtitles to the song are featured at the bottom of the screen.

Track listing
 12" vinyl
 "Blind Faith" – 3:53
 "Blind Faith"  – 4:12

 Promotional CD single No. 1
 "Blind Faith"  – 3:41
 "Blind Faith"  – 3:41

 Promotional CD single No. 2
 "Blind Faith" – 3:53
 "Blind Faith"  – 6:10
 "Blind Faith"  – 5:04

 Digital download EP
 "Blind Faith" – 3:53
 "Blind Faith"  – 4:12
 "Blind Faith"  – 6:10
 "Blind Faith"  – 5:04
 "Blind Faith"  – 9:21

Chart performance

Weekly charts

Year-end charts

Release history

See also
 List of UK Dance Singles Chart number ones of 2011

References

2011 singles
Chase & Status songs
Mercury Records singles
Song recordings produced by Chase & Status
Songs written by Saul Milton
Songs written by Will Kennard
RAM Records singles
2011 songs